Racing Blood is a 1954 American drama film directed by Wesley Barry and written by Samuel Roeca. The film stars Bill Williams, Jean Porter, Jimmy Boyd, George Cleveland, John Eldredge and Sam Flint. The film was released on March 3, 1954 by 20th Century-Fox.

Plot

Cast 
Bill Williams as Tex
Jean Porter as Lucille Mitchell
Jimmy Boyd as David
George Cleveland as Gramps
John Eldredge as 'Mitch' Mitchell
Sam Flint as Doc Nelson
George Steele as Wee Willie
Fred Kohler Jr. as John Emerson
Frankie Darro as Ben
Bobby Johnson as Mullins
Fred Kelsey as Smithy

References

External links 
 

1954 films
20th Century Fox films
American horse racing films
American drama films
1954 drama films
Films directed by Wesley Barry
1950s English-language films
1950s American films